Wiscasset, Maine is a town in the United States.

Wiscasset may also refer to:

 Wiscasset (CDP), Maine, a census-designated place; the town center
 Wiscasset, Waterville and Farmington Railway